Röhrich is a German-language surname. It may refer to:

Rod Rohrich, American plastic surgeon
Simon Rohrich, American inventor and entrepreneur 
Lutz Röhrich (1922-2006), German folklorist
The namesake of the Gustav Rohrich Sod House
Walter Roehrich, of Roehr Motorcycle Company

See also
Roerich (disambiguation)
Röhricht

German-language surnames